The following is the list of orders, decorations and medals related to British India:

Orders

Order of Chivalry

Order of the Star of India (1861-1947)
Order of the Indian Empire (1878-1947)
Order of the Crown of India (1878-1947)

Order of Merit

Order of British India (1837-1947)

Medals

Civil Medals

Kaisar-i-Hind Medal (1900-1947)

Military Medals

Indian Order of Merit (1837-1947)
Indian Distinguished Service Medal (1907-1947)

Police Medals

Indian Police Medal (1932-1950)

Commemoration Medals

Empress of India Medal (1877)
Delhi Durbar Medal (1903)
Delhi Durbar Medal (1911)

Campaign Medals

Monghyr Mutiny Medal (1766)
Deccan Medal (1784)
Mysore Medal (1793)
Egypt Medal (1801)
Seringapatam Medal (1801)
Capture of Ceylon Medal (1807)
Medal for capture of Rodrigues, Isle of Bourbon and Isle of France (1811)
Java Medal (1812)
Nepal Medal (1816)
Burma Medal (1826)
Coorg Medal (1837)
Ghuznee Medal (1839)
Jellalabad Medals (1842)
Medal for the Defence of Kelat-I-Ghilzie (1842)
Candahar, Ghuznee, Cabul Medal (1842)
China War Medal (1842)
Scinde Medal (1843)
Gwalior Star (1844)
Sutlej Medal (1846)
Punjab Medal (1849)
Army of India Medal (1851)
India General Service Medal (1854)
Indian Mutiny Medal (1858)
Second China War Medal (1861)
Afghanistan Medal (United Kingdom) (1881)
Abyssinian War Medal (1869)
Kabul to Kandahar Star (1881)
Central Africa Medal (1895)
India Medal (1896)
East and Central Africa Medal (1899)
China War Medal (1900)
Tibet Medal (1905)
India General Service Medal (1909)
India General Service Medal (1936)
India Service Medal (1946)

Battle Honours

Mysore (1789–91)
Egypt (battle honour) (1801)
Assaye (battle honour) (1803)
Abyssinia (battle honour) (1868)

Titles

Title Badge (India)

First Class

Sardar Bahadur
Diwan Bahadur

Second Class

Khan Bahadur
Rai Bahadur

Third Class

Khan Sahib
Rai Sahib

See also

Orders, decorations, and medals of the United Kingdom

References

External links

Medals of British India
British India Historical Medals

British India
Medals of the Honourable East India Company
Orders, decorations, and medals of British India
Lists of orders, decorations, and medals